The Canadian Welding Bureau is a certification and registration organization for companies involved in the welding of steel structures. Welders in Canada are required to be retested every two years by the Canadian Welding Bureau. The CWB Group was formed in 1947 to administer the then, new W47.1 welding standard for structural steel. The CWB has today expanded its scope well beyond the original structural steel roots and is accredited by the Standards Council of Canada as a Certification Body for the administration of CSA Standards including W47.1, W47.2, W55.3, W186, W178.1 and W48 to industries across Canada and internationally for:

 Certification of companies involved in welding 
 Certification of Welding Inspection Companies 
 Certification of Welding Inspectors 
 Certification of Welding Electrodes

Parent Company and Locations

The parent company of the CWB is the CWB Group - Industry Services.  The Canadian Welding Association (CWA), Quality Systems Assessment Registrar (QUASAR) and the CWB Institute (CWBi) are also part of the CWB Group and provide membership services, quality systems registration services and training services respectively.  CWB's global headquarters are located in Milton, Ontario, Canada.  Regional offices are located in Dartmouth, NS, Laval, QC, Winnipeg, MB, Edmonton and Nisku, AB.

The CWB has over 200 employees in Canada, the US and Asia.

Authorized National Body (ANB) Status 
The CWB is the Authorized National Body (ANB) in Canada for the International Institute of Welding (IIW) and is authorized to issue diplomas under the IWP, IWS, IWT and IWE programs.   In addition, the CWB is the Authorized National Body for Company Certification (ANBCC) for the IIW providing certification services under ISO 3834.

CWB Services
The CWB qualifies welders, welding inspectors, welding supervisors, welding engineers and welding electrodes/consumables. The activity of the CWB contributes to the high level of competence enjoyed by industries employing welding and joining and the consistent progress in welding technology, and the reliability of welded products.

CWB Institute (CWBi)
Comprehensive training courses and products are provided through the CWB Institute.  The CWBi was formerly known as the Gooderham Centre for Industrial Learning, which was created in 1996 following the closure of the Welding Institute of Canada (WIC).  Focusing primarily on welding related material, the CWBi provides training for welding supervisors (co-ordinators), welding inspectors, welding engineers and other welding professionals.  Training courses are offered in several formats, including classroom, on-line and self-study.   The CWBi maintains a series of 39 individual learning modules as part of the CWBi Modular Learning System. These learning modules cover a wide range of subject matter and are constantly updated by CWBi staff.  In addition, CWBi provides training for non-destructive evaluation methods including radiography, ultrasonic, magnetic particle and liquid penetrant.

CWB Office of Public Safety

In April 2013, the CWB Office of Public Safety was launched by the CWB.  A key mandate of the CWB is to enhance public safety through ensuring high quality and reliable welded structures.   To support this mandate, the Office of Public Safety developed the "WeldQuality Mark" to allow companies that meet the stringent requirements of CWB Certification programs to use a visible indicator of their commitment to quality and safety though the mark. The Office of Public Safety also maintains a unique web site that provides information and resources for the public, industry and government as well as the ability to request investigations around enforcement issues. The Office of Public Safety also provides resources to provide representation on key Canadian, American and International welding standard technical committees to ensure Canadian requirements and leadership in the area of welding standards is maintained.

Canadian Welding Association (CWA)

The Canadian Welding Association (CWA) has been in existence since the early 1920s.  The CWA became part of the CWB Group in May 2008, and currently has a membership of over 36,000 individuals. Dan Tadic is currently the Director of the CWA. Membership in the CWA is open to welding professionals, fabricators, and manufacturers.  The CWA has 24 local chapters across Canada, which provides a venue for local volunteers to promote the Association's goals of educating companies and their employees, improving productivity, profitability and safety in Canada's welding industry.  The CWA also provides a national voice for the welding industry in Canada, communicating its message to both Federal and Provincial Government.

QUASAR
The Quality Systems Assessment Registrar, or QUASAR, was formed in 1993 with a specific focus on the metal fabrication industry.  The CWB recognized the synergy between its existing welding certification programs and the ISO 9000 quality management system.  Since that time QUASAR has expanded both the industry segments it serves and the services it offers. QUASAR now offers registration services to the following standards and guidelines:

 ISO 9001 Quality management systems
 ISO 14001 Environmental management systems
 CAN3 - Z299 Quality Assurance Program
 OHSAS 18001 Occupational Health and Safety Management
 Canadian Institute of Steel Construction Steel Structures Certification
 Canadian Institute of Steel Construction Steel Bridges Certification
 CSA A660 "Certification of manufacturers of steel building systems"
 CSPI (Corrugated Steel Pipe Institute) Quality Guideline
 Ontario Regulation 22/04:Electrical Distribution Safety Certification

QUASAR is accredited by the Standards Council of Canada for its ISO 9001, ISO 14001 and Z299 programs.

References

External links

 Canadian Welding Association
 CWB Institute
 QUASAR
 CWB Office of Public Safety
 CWB QualityMark
 @cwbgroupandcwa on Twitter
 CWBGroup on YouTube

Global Headquarters location: 

Welding organizations
Organizations based in Ontario
Milton, Ontario